The Fifth Risk is a 2018 non-fiction book by Michael Lewis that examines the transition and political appointments of the Donald Trump presidency, especially with respect to three government agencies: the Department of Energy, the Department of Agriculture, and the Department of Commerce. The book spent fourteen weeks on The New York Times non-fiction best-seller list. A lengthy excerpt from the book was published twice by The Guardian, using a quote from a top adviser to Trump in the title.

Barack and Michelle Obama acquired the rights to the book for a Netflix series about the U.S. government. The 2022 American comedy series The G Word with Adam Conover is "loosely inspired" by the book.

Title
John MacWilliams, a risk management expert at the United States Department of Energy from the Obama Administration, gave Lewis the top five risks he saw for the department: broken arrows (loose nukes and nuclear accidents), North Korean nuclear weapons, the Iran nuclear deal, protecting the electrical grid from cyberterrorism, and internal project management. It is this fifth risk that inspired the title of the book.

See also
 Schedule F appointment—aborted Trump plan for reclassifying civil servants as political appointees

References

2018 controversies in the United States
2018 non-fiction books
American non-fiction books
Books about the Trump administration
Books by Michael Lewis
Criticism of Donald Trump
English-language books
Trump administration controversies
W. W. Norton & Company books